Qutb Shah, formally known as Syed Abdullāh Awn ibn Yaʿlā (سید) (c. 1028–1099), was a ruler, medieval Persian Sufi Muslim preacher, and a religious scholar. He was descended from Abbas ibn Ali and was a maternal cousin of Abdul Qadir Gilani.

Initially, he belonged to the Imamia sect of Islam, but later he was influenced by the teachings of his cousin, Abdul Qadir Gilani, and ended up becoming a Hanbali-Zaydi. His Hanbali-Zaydi Sufi school tried to integrate perfectionism of commandments and agape-oriented activism. Ibn Arabi also tried this synergy by admiring Ibn Hazm which raised legal paradoxes and became controversial in ultranomian circles.

Qutb Shah, in first quarter of 11th century, ruled Herat (then Khorasan), where supposedly there was a power vacuum, and people made him their ruler due to his religious stature. After taking the throne of Herat, he also joined forces with Mahmud of Ghazni when Mahmud invaded Sub-continent. He ruled Herat until his death. All of his children migrated to modern-day Pakistan, and settled near Salt Range, on his command. He is claimed to be primary ancestor of "Syed Alvi Awans". He is buried in Iraq near Imam Musa Kazim.

References

1020 births
1090 deaths
Sunni clerics
Hashemite people
Alvis
Awans
Sufi religious leaders
Year of death unknown